Mehmetli is a small belde (town) in Sumbas district of Osmaniye Province, Turkey. The population of Mehmetli is 1524 as of 2010. The name of the town refers to personal name Mehmet which is very common in the settlement. The settlement was founded in 1835 as a small village of several families. In 1998 it was declared a seat of township.

References

Populated places in Osmaniye Province
Towns in Turkey
Sumbas District